is an original video animation (OVA) anime series in the Gundam franchise. Released from January 25, 1996, to July 25, 1999, the 12-episode series details the exploits of an Earth Federation ground unit during the One Year War - specifically a month after the beginning of the original 1979 Gundam series and into the final weeks of the war.

Plot
The series is set in Universal Century 0079 in the jungles of Southeast Asia. The Earth Federation and the Principality of Zeon are fighting a brutal guerrilla war for control of the area and its resources. Zeon's best hope for victory in the region rests with an experimental mobile armor and its pilot, Aina Sahalin. Meanwhile, the Earth Federation Army receive reinforcements in the form of Ensign Shiro Amada, newly named commander of the 08th MS Team. Aina and Shiro know each other from a mutual rescue in space, but when Shiro discovers that Aina is in fact the pilot of the Zeon mobile armor he is arrested for treason.

The Federation offers Shiro one chance at redemption: he must take the 08th MS Team deep into Zeon held territory to find Zeon's hidden base. With the Zeon backed into a corner, and the Federation dependent on Shiro and his team for victory, the star crossed lovers must decide where their true allegiances lie: with each other, or with their respective sides.

Characters

Main characters
SLt. Shiro Amada

Shiro is the new platoon leader of the Earth Federation's 08th Mobile Suit Team stationed in Southeast Asia. Before he assumes this position, however, he befriends Aina Sahalin, a Zeon pilot, up in space and unbeknownst to both of them their fates become intertwined.

Aina Sahalin

A member of a noble family back in the Zeon homeland, Aina is the senior test pilot of a new mobile armor program led by her brother Ginias. While piloting her prototype Zaku amidst a debris field in space, she meets Shiro Amada and forms a bond with him even if they are on opposite sides of the war. Circumstances result in the two of them meeting again later in the series.

Support characters
Cpl. Eledore Massis

Massis is a veteran member of the 08th MS Team and drives the team's support hovertruck. He's not very brave and openly admits he's not cut out to be a soldier, but puts himself in danger when he has to, especially when Karen is involved.

Major general Ginias Sahalin

Aina Sahalin's elder brother, Ginias is a Zeon officer assigned by the Zeon leadership to build a mobile weapon powerful enough to destroy the Earth Federation Forces military headquarters of Jaburo. Although Ginias is quite brilliant and a kind military superior, he also suffers from an unknown illness.

SGM Karen Joshua

The team's longest-serving mobile suit pilot, Karen is initially underwhelmed when Shiro takes over the team with her as second-in-command. As a former medical student and the widow of a military doctor, Karen can double as a field medic in cases of emergency.

Kiki Rosita

Kiki is the daughter of an anti-Zeon guerrilla resistance leader. She encounters Shiro just before he is taken captive by the guerrillas and is infatuated with him. When Shiro finally convinces them to assist the 08th MS Team, Kiki follows him, coordinating support and providing communication between the MS unit and the resistance.

Cpl. Michel Ninorich

Joining the 08th MS Team at the same time as Shiro, Michel is Eledore's partner in the support hovertruck, serving as navigator and gunner. Between battles, he writes letters to his girlfriend BB, who still lives in the space colonies.

Col. Norris Packard

An ace pilot assigned to Zeon forces in Southeast Asia as an observer, Norris is later stationed at Ginias Sahalin's secret base and sees Aina Sahalin work on the Apsalus mobile armor program. He dies in Episode 10 fighting Federation troops laying siege to the base after suffering a fatal blow from Shiro Amada.

Sgt. Terry Sanders Jr.

The other veteran member of the 08th MS Team at the start of the series, Sanders has had a mean streak of bad luck: every team he would be assigned to is destroyed during their third mission together. Since he is the sole survivor, this earns him the unfortunate nickname of "Shinigami Sanders", "Sanders the Reaper" in the English version.

Major general Yuri Kellarny

A family friend of the Sahalins, Kellarny leads a Zeon military division in Europe. Although he acts gruff and ill-mannered around the Sahalins, he is depicted as an honorable soldier who always looks after his men. After the Odessa base falls to the Federation, Yuri leads the survivors of his division towards Ginias' base, hoping to find any launch vehicles. Ginias kills him as he tries to get in.

LTC. Kojima

The commander of the 08th MS Team's parent unit, the Kojima Battalion, Kojima is a typical by-the-book officer who does whatever he is told by his superiors. Towards the end, however, he is visibly shaken by the brutal tactics of Captain Isan Ryer and defies him, thinking that enough good people have already died.

Featured mobile suits

Earth Federation
 RX-75 Mass Production Guntank (量産型ガンタンク) (Type: Soldier)
 RB-79K Ball Type K (先行量産型ボール) (Type: Soldier)
 RX-79[G] Ground Gundam (陸戦型ガンダム) (Type: Soldier)
 RX-79[G]Ez-8 Gundam Ez8 (ガンダムEZ8) (Type: Commander)
 RGM-79E Prototype GM (初期型ジム) (Type: Soldier)
 RGM-79G Ground GM (陸戦型ジム) (Type: Soldier)
 RGM-79G GM Sniper (ジム・スナイパー) (Type: Soldier)

Zeon
 MSM-04 Acguy (アッガイ) (Type: Soldier)
 MS-05 Zaku I (ザクI) (Type: Soldier)
 MS-05 Topp's Zaku (トップ専用ザク) (Type: Commander)
 MS-06 Zaku II (ザクII) (Type: Soldier)
 MS-06J Dell's Zaku (デル専用ザク) (Type: Commander)
 MS-06J Ash's Zaku (アス専用ザク) (Type: Commander)
 MS-06JC Ground Zaku II (陸戦型ザクII) (Type: Soldier)
 MS-06K Zaku Cannon (ザクキャノン) (Type: Soldier)
 MS-06V Zaku Tank (ザクタンク) (Type: Soldier)
 MS-06RD-4 Prototype Zaku II (宇宙用高機動試験型ザク) (Type: Soldier)
 MS-07B-3 Gouf Custom (グフカスタム) (Type: Commander)
 MS-07H-8 Gouf Flight Type (グフフライトタイプ) (Type: Soldier)
 MS-09 Dom (ドム) (Type: Soldier)

Media

Production and development
The series first took shape in 1995. The OVA's first episode released on January 25, 1996. Production went well until director Takeyuki Kanda died on July 27, 1996 in a car crash. GONZO's Umanosuke Iida took over production for the rest of the series. This resulted in delays in releasing the other OVA episodes in Japan.

Film
Mobile Suit Gundam: The 08th MS Team Miller's Report is a compilation film released on August 1, 1998. The film largely focuses on Shiro Amada's court martial over his concern towards the enemy. The film mixes footage from the first eight episodes along with new footage. It also introduces the titular character, Alice Miller, an Earth Federation investigator assigned to gather additional evidence against Shiro. Miller's Report was not fully shown on TV in America, although the new scenes were all spliced into the eighth episode for the Toonami broadcast. Miller's Report was released on DVD in America separately from the main series, but is included as a fifth disc with all 12 episodes (4 discs) in the Collector's Edition Box Set. Bandai Visual released the film on Blu-ray in 2011. The film explains the plot connection between episodes eight and nine by showing the Eledore's return from leave, the court-martial after Shiro's defense of the village, and the team's issuance of new orders.

Manga
Mobile Suit Gundam 08th MS Team: U.C.0079＋α, a manga adaptation by Umanosuke Iida, was serialized in Monthly Gundam Ace from 2007 to 2009 and collected into four volumes.

References

External links

 Official Website: Anime
 
 Mobile Suit Gundam: The 08th MS Team at Internet Movie Database
 

1996 anime OVAs
1998 anime films
1999 anime OVAs
1999 Japanese novels
2007 manga
Bandai Entertainment anime titles
08th MS Team
Light novels
Madman Entertainment anime
Kadokawa Shoten manga
Odex
Films with screenplays by Ichirō Ōkouchi
Shōnen manga
Sunrise (company)
Toonami
Films scored by Kohei Tanaka